The modern buildings on Zhongshan Square in Dalian refer to the buildings on Zhongshan Square in Dalian, Liaoning Province, China, built mostly in the first half of the twentieth century, during which time Dalian was Japan's leased territory.

These buildings were declared the "Cultural Heritage Sites under Protection by the Chinese State Government" in 2001 and the "Heritage Buildings under Protection by the Dalian Municipal Government" in 2002. The scene of this area with the modern buildings of the first half of the 20th century in China is comparable, in a smaller scale, to that of The Shanghai Bund.

Zhongshan Square

It was later renamed by the Japanese as Ōhiroba (in ), meaning the large plaza. After 1945, it was further renamed as Zhongshan Square, after Sun Zhongshan, the first president of the Republic of China.

The square is round and is 213 meters in diameter.  There are ten roads that come radially out of the square, anticlockwise:
 Zhongshan Road - west
 Yuguang Street
 Yan'an Road - south
 Jiefang Street
 Luxun Road
 Renmin Road - east
 Qiyi Street
 Minsheng Street
 Shanghai Road - north
 Minkang Street

The Buildings

On Zhongshan Square, there are presently ten buildings.  They are from the building with the address of No. 1 Zhongshan Square, on the north side, with the names of the current occupants, anticlockwise:

Industrial and Commercial Bank of China #1

The Renaissance architecture building with Corinthian columns in front at No. 1 Zhongshan Square, between  Minkang Street and Zhongshan Road, is now Industrial and Commercial Bank of China's Zhongshan Square Branch.

It was built in December, 1920, as Dalian Branch of Bank of Korea (in ).  Architect: Yoshihei Nakamura (in ), residing in Korea at that time, designing the headquarters building of this bank.

Citibank

The building at No. 2 Zhongshan Square, between Zhongshan Road and Yuguang Street, is now used as Citibank's Dalian Branch and other offices.

It was built in 1908 as Dalian Police Station (in ) which took care of both police and resident registration.  It is the oldest building on this square and was designed by the team headed by Shoin Maeda (in ) of the Kwantung government, who later was invited to become professor at Tokyo High School of Technology, the predecessor of Tokyo Institute of Technology.

Dalian Financial Building

The new Postmodern architecture building at No. 3 Zhongshan Square, between Yuguang Street and Yan'an Road, is Dalian Financial Building (in ),  built in 2000.  Since 2001, it has been occupied by Shanghai Pudong Development Bank's Dalian Branch on the right side (on Yuguang Street) and Guangdong Development Bank's Dalian Branch on the left side (on Yan'an Road).

At this site stood the British Consulate General's building, completed in 1914 (Architect: H. Ashead).  It was demolished in 1995.

Note 1
Adjacent to the Consulate General's office on the Yuguang Street side (No. 2 Yuguang Street) stood Dalian Anglican church, whose second generation red brick building, built in 1928 in a joint effort of the Church of England and Japanese Anglican Church, still remains there, used as Yuguang Street Church.

Dalian Hotel

The 4-storey Renaissance architecture building with Ionic columns in front at No. 4 Zhongshan Square, between Yan'an Road and Jiefang Street, is now the Dalian Hotel.

Industrial and Commercial Bank of China #2

The building at No. 5 Zhongshan Square, between Jiefang Street and Luxun Road, is now Industrial and Commercial Bank of China's Dalian Branch (in ).

It was built in 1919 as Dalian City Hall (in ) and was designed by the team headed by Shigemitsu Matsumuro (in ) of the Kwantung government.

Bank of Communications

The Art Deco building at No. 6 Zhongshan Square, between Luxun and Renmin Roads, is now Bank of Communications' Dalian Branch.

It was built in 1936, under the design of Shuichi Munetaka, as Dalian Branch of Oriental Development Company (in ), Japan's state-owned enterprise, that had branches in Korea and China.

China CITIC Bank

The French-style Renaissance architecture building at No. 7 Zhongshan Square, between Renmin Road and Qiyi Street, is now China CITIC Bank.

It was built in 1910 as Dalian Branch of Daqing Bank (in ).

Note 2
Adjacent to this building on the Renmin Road side (No. 6 Renmin Road) is Zhongshan Square Branch of Bank of Dalian (in ).  It was formerly the Dalian Branch of Bank of Taiwan (in ), built in 1910.

Dalian People's Culture Club

The building at No. 8 Zhongshan Square, between Qiyi and Minsheng Streets, is Dalian People's Culture Club (in ), built in 1951 by the Soviet architecture team led by a Belorussian engineer. It has been the center of music and other cultural activities for the Dalianese people.

Bank of China

The colorful building at No. 9 Zhongshan Square, between Minsheng Street and Shanghai Road, is now Bank of China's Dalian Branch, together with the new main building on the back side, added in 2005, where the bank transactions are done mostly.

It was built in 1909 as Dalian Branch of Yokohama Specie Bank (in ), designed by Tsumaki Yorinaka (in ) and his disciple, Satoshi Ōta.  It was used as the Soviet Union's Far East Bank from 1945 to 1955.  The building's interior was massively changed in the 2005 renovation.

Dalian Post Office

The building at No. 10 Zhongshan Square, between Shanghai Road and Minkang Street, is now used as part of Dalian Post Office, whose main office is on Chanjiang Road in front of Dalian Railway Station.

It was built in December, 1917, as Kwantung Bureau of Communications (in ) and was designed by the team headed by Shigemitsu Matsumuro of Kwantung government.

Protection by the State and Local Governments
All these buildings, except Dalian Financial Building and the buildings written in the Notes, were declared in 2001:  
 The Major Site Protected at the National Level
All buildings were designated in 2002:
 The "Heritage Buildings under Protection by the Dalian Municipal Government" (in )

See also
 Dalian
 Russian Dalian
 Zhongshan Square (Dalian)
 The Bund (Shanghai)#Architecture and buildings

References

Buildings and structures in Dalian
Chinese architectural history
Tourism in China
Cultural heritage of China